Jacob Pieter "Jaap" Murre (born 18 September 1929) is a Dutch mathematician who specializes in algebraic geometry. He is a professor emeritus of mathematics at Leiden University.

Career
Murre was born on 18 September 1929 in Baarland. At his small primary school one of his classmates and friends was later botanist . Murre studied mathematics at Leiden University and in 1957 he obtained his doctorate under Hendrik Kloosterman with a thesis titled: "Over multipliciteiten van maximaal samenhangende bossen". In 1959 he was appointed as associate professor (lector) at Leiden University. In 1961 he became professor of mathematics at the same institute, with a teaching assignment in algebraic geometry. He retired in 1994.

Murre was elected a member of the Royal Netherlands Academy of Arts and Sciences in 1971.

References

External links
Profile at Leiden University
 

1929 births
Living people
Algebraic geometers
Dutch mathematicians
Leiden University alumni
Academic staff of Leiden University
Members of the Royal Netherlands Academy of Arts and Sciences
People from Borsele